Fulvio Sulmoni (born 4 January 1986) is a Swiss former football defender. Sulmoni played for FC Lugano, FC Locarno, FC Chiasso, AC Bellinzona and FC Thun.

External links
 
 

1986 births
Living people
Swiss men's footballers
FC Lugano players
FC Locarno players
FC Chiasso players
AC Bellinzona players
FC Thun players
Swiss Super League players
Swiss Challenge League players
Association football defenders
People from Mendrisio
Sportspeople from Ticino